

1999–2000

|-
|colspan=7 align=center|2000 Southern Conference men's basketball tournament

2000–01

|-
|colspan=7 align=center|2001 Southern Conference men's basketball tournament

2001–02

|-
|colspan=7 align=center|2002 Southern Conference men's basketball tournament

2002–03

|-
|colspan=7 align=center|2003 Southern Conference men's basketball tournament

2003–04

|-
|colspan=7 align=center|2004 Big South Conference men's basketball tournament

2004–05

2005–06

2006–07

|-
|colspan=7 align=center|2007 Big South Conference men's basketball tournament

References

VMI Keydets basketball seasons